Wilcox is a ghost town in Wilcox Township, Trego County, Kansas, United States.

History
Wilcox was issued a post office in 1879. The post office was discontinued in 1896.

The Wilcox one room school building still stands in good condition. The roof of the school was replaced after 2009.

References

Former populated places in Trego County, Kansas
Former populated places in Kansas